The Lac d'Oô is an artificial lake in the Pyrenees with an area of 42 hectares located at an altitude of 1507 m in the commune of Oô.

Galerie

References 

Oo